Alfred Hörtnagl (born 24 September 1966 in Matrei am Brenner) is a retired Austrian football player.

Club career
Born in Tyrol, the defensive midfielder played mostly for Tirol Innsbruck. Also he played  for Austrian big clubs Rapid Wien and Sturm Graz as well as a short period in Greece and Cyprus.

International career
He made his debut for Austria in 1989 and was a participant at the 1990 FIFA World Cup where he played in two matches. He earned 27 caps, scoring one goal. His last international was a September 2001 World Cup qualification match against Spain.

International goals
Scores and results list Austria's goal tally first.

Honours
Austrian Football Bundesliga (5):
 1989, 1990, 2000, 2001, 2002
Austrian Cup (3):
 1989, 1993, 1996

References

External links
 Personal Website
 Rapid stats - Rapid Archive
 

1966 births
Living people
People from Innsbruck-Land District
Austrian footballers
Austria international footballers
1990 FIFA World Cup players
FC Wacker Innsbruck (2002) players
FC Admira Wacker Mödling players
SK Sturm Graz players
SK Rapid Wien players
APOEL FC players
Kavala F.C. players
Austrian Football Bundesliga players
Super League Greece players
Cypriot First Division players
Austrian expatriate footballers
Expatriate footballers in Greece
Expatriate footballers in Cyprus
Association football midfielders
Footballers from Tyrol (state)
FC Tirol Innsbruck players
Austrian expatriate sportspeople in Greece
Austrian expatriate sportspeople in Cyprus
FC Wacker Innsbruck players
FC Swarovski Tirol players